The St. James Hotel is an historic, 12-story hotel in Center City, Philadelphia, Pennsylvania. It was designed by Horace Trumbauer and was built in 1901, with an addition being constructed in 1904.

See also 
 National Register of Historic Places listings in Center City, Philadelphia

References 

Hotel buildings completed in 1901
Eclectic architecture
Skyscraper hotels in Philadelphia
Hotel buildings on the National Register of Historic Places in Philadelphia
Rittenhouse Square, Philadelphia